The History of the Wigan Warriors stretches back to the club's foundation in 1872. It was one of the founding members of the Northern Rugby Football Union after the schism from the one code of rugby football in 1895. At the elite competition level, Wigan is the most successful club in the history of British Rugby League, measured by total of trophies won. The club has won 22 Rugby Football League Championships (including 5 Super League Grand Finals), 20 Challenge Cups and 4 World Club Challenge trophies.

Wigan enjoyed a period of sustained success from the 1980s to mid-1990s which included winning the Challenge Cup eight seasons in succession and the League Championship seven seasons in succession. During this period Wigan won many other trophies including the Regal Trophy six times and the Premiership six times. The Wigan club has a Hall of Fame and has honoured several former players via induction into it. The inductees include former players Billy Boston, Ellery Hanley, Dean Bell and Shaun Edwards.

Late 19th century

On 21 November 1872 Wigan Football Club was founded by members of Wigan Cricket Club at a meeting in the Royal Hotel, Standishgate. Wigan F.C. played on Folly Field, near Upper Dicconson Street. A practice match took place on 30 November at Folly Field. After a series of trial and practice matches, the team travelled to Warrington to play its first competitive match on 18 January 1873. The game ended in a draw.

Financial difficulties and an inability to recruit quality players led to many players and members from Upholland F.C. joining the club in 1876. The club became Wigan & District F.C and moved and played its home games at the Wigan Cricket Club at Prescott Street just off Frog Lane. It is unlikely that the club fulfilled its fixtures in 1877 and disbanded at the end of the 1879 cricket season.

On 22 September 1879, the club was reformed as Wigan Wasps by some members of the original Wigan Football Club (one of which was the mayor) and many new members at a meeting in the Dicconson Arms. The club moved back to Folly Field. In 1883, Wigan won its first trophy, the Wigan Charity Cup. The club won the West Lancashire Cup in 1884 and the Wigan Union Charity Cup in 1885. The club played in cherry and white jerseys for the first time on 26 September 1885. In 1888 the club hosted the touring New Zealand Maoris.

Wigan was suspended by the RFU for breaking the strict amateur code despite its argument that broken-time payments were necessary to avoid undue hardship for its working class players. In 1895 Wigan joined with other clubs from Yorkshire and Lancashire to found the Northern Union which led to the sport of rugby league. This was a result of the breakaway from the Rugby Football Union. The "Wasps" tag was dropped and the club became known as Wigan.

Wigan's initial Northern Union game was played on 7 September 1895 against Broughton Rangers. The team's lineup that day was:

Billy Benson, forward
Jack Blackburn, forward
Jack Brown, forward
Frank Dixon, half back
Billy Halliwell, half back
Percy Jago, three-quarter back
J. Perkins, forward
E. Railton, three-quarter back
George Rigby, forward
Johnny Roberts, three-quarter back
Billy Unsworth, forward
Jimmy Walkden, three-quarter back
E. Webster, forward
John Winstanley, full back
Bill Yates, forward

When the County Championship was introduced in October 1895, Cheshire played a Lancashire team that contained three players from Wigan: Winstanley (full back) and Unsworth and Brown (forwards).

In 1896–97, because of the large number of Northern Union teams, the Northern League was abandoned in favour of two County Senior leagues. The second half of the season saw the introduction of the Northern Union Cup, later known as the Rugby League Cup. Wigan reached the third round before being knocked out by St. Helens.

Early 20th century

In 1904, 14 clubs resigned from the two county leagues to form a new Northern Rugby League for season 1901–02. Wigan however remained in the Lancashire Senior Competition.

Wigan became sub-tenants of Springfield Park, which the club shared with Wigan United AFC, playing its first game there on 14 September 1901. A crowd of 4,000 saw Wigan beat Morecambe 12–0. During this season Wigan won the Lancashire Senior Competition.

Wigan's record crowd at Springfield Park was 10,000 when the team beat Widnes on 19 March 1902. The last game there was on 28 April 1902 when Wigan beat the Rest of Lancashire Senior Competition. Two meetings were held by Wigan members during the season to discuss the possibility of turning the club into a Limited Company did not come to fruition.

On 6 September 1902, Wigan played at Central Park for the first time in the opening match of the newly formed First Division. An estimated crowd of 9,000 spectators saw Wigan beat Batley 14–8.

In the 1905–06 season theclub won its first cup in rugby league, the Lancashire County Cup. Between 1906 and 1923 Wigan won the Lancashire League seven times and the Lancashire Cup four times. Wigan were the first winners of the Lancashire Cup.

Wigan played New Zealand on 9 November 1907 and won by 12 points to 8 in front of a crowd of around 30,000.
Great Britain, then known as the Northern Union, played its first test match against New Zealand on 25 January 1908. Jim Leytham, Bert Jenkins, and Johnny Thomas of Wigan were in the home side and Jim Leytham scored a try. Bert Jenkins and Johnny Thomas had previously played in the first Welsh game against New Zealand on 1 January 1908.

On Saturday 28 October 1911, Wigan played a match against the Australasian team which visited England on the 1911–12 Kangaroo tour of Great Britain and won.

On 12 May 1921, Wigan became a limited company.

In June 1922 Jim Sullivan joined Wigan from Cardiff RFC when he was 17 years old. His value was put at £750, which was a staggering signing-on fee for an adolescent who had not played 13-a-side rugby. His first game was at home against Widnes on 27 August 1921, and he scored ten points in a 21–0 win. Sullivan scored the first points in the first Challenge Cup Final to be played at Wembley Stadium, kicking a penalty after three minutes of the inaugural Challenge Cup Final against Dewsbury in 1929 in which he led Wigan to a 13–2 victory. Sullivan became player-coach in 1932.

Wigan won its first Challenge Cup in the 1923–24 season when the team beat Oldham 21–4 in Rochdale. In 1933 the Prince of Wales attended Central Park, becoming the first royal to watch a rugby league match.

On 25 October 1938 Australian Harry Sunderland arrived in Wigan to take up the duties of Secretary-Manager at Central Park. On 28 September the following year, Sunderland's contract was terminated and he and the club parted company.

The outbreak of World War II disrupted the Rugby Football League Championship but Wigan continued to play in the Lancashire War League and the Emergency War League.

During the war years the club went through the 1940–41 season unbeaten although it lost the Championship final. It lost the 1944 Challenge Cup Final over two games to Bradford Northern 8–3 but made up for it beating Dewsbury in the Championship Final.

Mid 20th century

Jim Sullivan's last game as a player was at Mount Pleasant, Batley, on 23 February 1946. He remained at Central Park for a further six seasons as coach.

In 1948 Wigan took part in the first televised rugby league match when its 8–3 Challenge Cup Final victory over Bradford Northern was broadcast to the Midlands. This was the first rugby league match to be attended by the reigning monarch, King George VI, who presented the trophy.

On Saturday 27 October 1951 33,230 spectators saw Wigan beat Leigh 14–6 in the final of the Lancashire Cup at Station Road, Swinton. In 1952 Wigan won its sixth consecutive Lancashire Cup.

Wigan featured in the first league match to be broadcast on television, a clash with Wakefield Trinity at Central Park on 12 January 1952.

In 1953 Wigan signed Billy Boston for £150. 8,000 fans saw Boston make his début for Wigan in the 'A' team. He became one of the most successful and famous Wigan players of all time. Eric Ashton signed for Wigan for £150 in 1955. Wigan went to Wembley six times in the Boston/Ashton era and won three times.

The visit of St. Helens on 27 March 1959 produced Central Park's all-time record attendance of 47,747 which is a record for any rugby league game in Lancashire. Wigan won the game 19–14 after holding off a Saints comeback.

Joe Egan coached Wigan and during his time the club won the Championship play-off final in 1960 defeating Wakefield Trinity 21–5, the Challenge Cup in 1958, 1959, 13–9 against Workington Town and 30–13 against Hull respectively before losing in 12–6 to St. Helens in 1961 which was to be his last game in charge.

Wigan had regular success in both league and cup competitions until 1974 when Wigan went 8 seasons without winning any leagues or cups.

Eric Ashton coached Wigan from 1963 to 1973. In 1966, Wigan locked television cameras out of its ground in the belief that they affected attendances. They were fined £500 by the Rugby Football League. Wigan beat Oldham 16–13 in the 1966 Lancashire Cup Final. Billy Boston played his last match in the cherry and white, against Wakefield Trinity]at the end of April 1968.

Late 20th century

Wigan celebrated its centenary year in November 1972, with a match against Australia at Central Park, on Saturday 17 November, the result finished as an 18–18 draw.

Wigan pulled off a surprise victory 19–9 over Salford in the Lancashire Cup Final played at Wilderspool, Warrington on Saturday 13 October 1973. Cup holders Salford had lost only one match before the final, against the touring Australians.

Ted Toohey became coach of Wigan in May 1974 before being sacked in January 1975, setting the pattern of coaches lasting one or two seasons before being replaced. Joe Coan (who coached St Helens to multiple victories) took control until he resigned in September 1976, the board accepted his decision "with reluctance".  Vince Karalius took over but was sacked in September 1979.

Kel Coslett was coach between October 1979 and April 1980. In 1980, Wigan were relegated from the top flight for the only time in the history of the club and Coslett was replaced by George Fairbairn. During the second division season the club recorded a record average attendance for the division of 8,198. Wigan won promotion to the top flight the following season but Fairbairn lasted no longer than May 1981.

Maurice Lindsay came to Wigan in the early 1980s to join directors Jack Robinson, Tom Rathbone and David Bradshaw. Maurice Bamford replaced Fairbairn as coach in 1981. A year later Bamford was sacked and replaced by Alex Murphy who had just coached neighbours Leigh to First Division Championship glory.

Under Murphy and assistant Bill Ashurst, Wigan won their first John Player Trophy beating Leeds 15–4 at Elland Road in January 1983. The following season Murphy took Wigan to Wembley for the first time in 14 years where they lost to Widnes in the 1984 Challenge Cup final.

In 1985, now coached by Colin Clarke and Alan McInnes, Wigan returned to Wembley this time as victors beating Hull 28–24 in front of a crowd of 99,801 in one of the best finals in the competition's history. Brett Kenny won the Lance Todd trophy as man of the match, scoring a memorable try to add to other exciting scores by John Ferguson (2), Henderson Gill and Shaun Edwards.

High-profile signings followed in 1985-86 including Andy Goodway, Ellery Hanley and Joe Lydon. Following further John Player Trophy success in 1986 Wigan appointed former New Zealand coach Graham Lowe to replace Clarke and McInnes.

Between February and October 1987 and with latest signing Andy Gregory, Wigan won a record 29 games in succession: 20 Division One matches, 3 Premiership Trophy matches, 4 Lancashire Cup matches, 1 Charity Shield final, and 1 World Club Challenge final. During that time Wigan secured the First Division Championship (1986–87) and defeated the Australian club, Manly-Warringah, 8–2 in front of a crowd of over 38,000 at Central Park for an unofficial World Club Championship. It was the first time a team of Englishmen had beaten a team of Australians at rugby league since 1978. From 1988 to 1995, Wigan won the Challenge Cup eight seasons in a succession; coached by Graham Lowe 1988, 89; John Monie 1989–93, John Dorahy 1994 and Graeme West 1995; this period was Wigan's most successful period. The club also won the Championship seven times, John Player/Regal Trophy four times, Premiership Trophy three times, Charity Shield twice and three World Club Championships. Wigan played in a special 2 match challenge series against Bath RFC in 1996, with one game played under league rules, and the other under union rules. Wigan won the league game 82–6 at Maine Road, but lost the return union game 44–19 at Twickenham, despite scoring some fantastic tries.

In July 1996 Andy Farrell was named the Wigan club's captain.

In 1997, the club was renamed Wigan Warriors. Wigan's dominance was threatened with the new fully professional league, the introduction of the salary cap and the 20/20 rule. After going out of the Challenge Cup to Salford in 1996 and St Helens in 1997, Wigan returned to Wembley for the final time in 1998. Still undefeated in the league and coach, John Monie never having lost a cup tie, meant Wigan were favourites against Sheffield Eagles. But on 2 May 1998 the Eagles caused the biggest upset in the competition's history with a 17–8 win.

Wigan won the Minor Premiership and the first Super League Grand Final in 1998 with a 10–4 victory over Leeds Rhinos at Old Trafford Stadium in Manchester.

In November 1999, coach Andy Goodway was sacked by chairman Maurice Lindsay after the Warriors' failure to win a trophy for the first time in 15 years. After a buy-out by Dave Whelan, both the Warriors and the town's football team, Wigan Athletic, moved to the JJB Stadium. As part of the rugby league's "on the road" scheme Wigan Warriors met Gateshead Thunder at Tynecastle, Edinburgh.  Maurice Lindsay returned as director. Wigan's final game at Central Park was against archrivals St Helens on Sunday 5 September 1999 . Ellery Hanley returned as St Helens coach but a Jason Robinson try meant the game was won by Wigan 28–20. The first game at the new stadium was a defeat in a Super League play-off match against Castleford Tigers on 19 September 1999.

Early 21st century

Frank Endacott joined Wigan Warriors as head coach after the 1999 season and coached them until 2001, when he was sacked.

In 2000 Wigan finished top of the Super League and reached the Grand Final for the second time but this time lost to St Helens 29–16. Wigan reached the Grand Final again the year after but lost to Bradford Bulls 37–4 which is still the biggest winning margin in a Super League Grand Final. That year Andy Farrell also set a new club record for points in a season with 429. In 2002 Wigan won their 17th Challenge Cup when they beat St Helens 21–12 at Murrayfield Stadium, 7 years after previously lifting the cup.

Wigan coach Stuart Raper was sacked as head coach of the club on 29 July 2003 due to a lack of success.
He was replaced by assistant coach Mike Gregory and the team improved and reached the Grand Final only to lose to Bradford Bulls 25–12. In 2004 Gregory guided Wigan to the Challenge Cup final at the Millennium Stadium in Cardiff but Wigan lost to St Helens 32–16. It was Mike Gregory's last match as head coach of Wigan, he travelled to the United States of America to get treatment for an illness that he contracted after an insect bite while in Australia.
It was revealed that Mike had motor neurone disease and he did not return as Wigan coach; he was not sacked but Wigan allowed his contract to expire.   Mike felt that during 2004, he was able to return but the club blocked his return to work.  Wigan also appointed Ian Millward as head coach. Wigan did not have the success they expected under Ian Millward and in 2006 Wigan were bottom of the league and facing relegation from Super League. Wigan sacked Millward and replaced him with Brian Noble. Brian Noble signed Michael Dobson. and signed Stuart Fielden from Bradford Bulls for a record fee of £450,000 Wigan avoided relegation in 2006 but still had problems with the salary cap which they had breached in 2005 and 2006. Some of the fans chose to blamed Wigan Chairman Maurice Lindsay for the lack of success and salary cap problems at the club, Wigan were fined and docked points for exceeding the salary cap by £222,314. In 2007 Maurice Lindsay announced that he would step down as Wigan Chairman at the end of 2007 and later that month Dave Whelan announced he would consider selling the club at the end of the season. Harlequins RL chairman and lifelong Wigan rugby league fan Ian Lenagan bought the club from Dave Whelan promising to start a new era at Wigan Warriors. Ian Lenagan officially took over as chairman and owner on 1 December 2007.

The 2007 season saw Wigan reach the Challenge Cup Semi-Final losing out to Catalans Dragons by 24–37.

During the 2007 season, Wigan would go on to reach the Final Eliminator of the Super League play-offs. However, the team lost that particular match by 36–6 against Leeds Rhinos. The same fixture at the same stage of the 2008 season took place with Wigan coming out losers on that occasion also against Leeds Rhinos by 18–14.

Wigan confirmed via the official website that they had been granted charitable status on Wednesday 29 April 2009. This involves the club receiving extra funding to provide rugby league related activities to young people throughout the North West of England.

Wigan confirmed in an official club statement on Tuesday 23 June 2009 that Gareth Hock tested positive for the primary metabolite of Cocaine; Benzoylecgonine, following an 'A' sample taken following a match vs Salford on Friday 5 June 2009. Wigan also confirmed that Gareth Hock faces a two-year ban, beginning June 2009, from the sport as sample 'B' came back positive. This is the first publicised incident of its kind in the club's history.

Wigan reached the Challenge Cup Semi-Final in 2009 losing out to Warrington Wolves by 26–39. The team also reached the Final Eliminator again. This time, losing out to St. Helens by 14–10. Following that loss, Brian Noble, then head coach confirmed his departure.
Michael Maguire was appointed new Head Coach on 7 October 2009.

In 2010, under the guidance of new head coach Michael Maguire, Wigan started the new season with a 38 to 6 win over the Crusaders. Wigan won their opening 4 games to take them to the top of the Super League table. Wigan remained top of the league throughout the season.

During 2010 the Wigan club won 3 pieces of silverware. These were the Floodlit 9s, League Leaders Shield (1st place after 27 rounds) and the Super League Grand Final.

On 2 October they won the Super League Grand Final, their first win since 1998, beating St. Helens 22–10.

The club also swept the boards at the annual Man of Steel Award, with Sam Tomkins winning young player of the year, Michael Maguire won the coach of the year award, Pat Richards won the Man of Steel award and the club won the club of the year award. On 6 August 2011, Wigan made it to the Challenge Cup final after beating St. Helens 18–12.

On 27 August 2011, Wigan Warriors won the Challenge Cup final against Leeds Rhinos at Wembley Stadium. The final score was Wigan 28–18 Leeds. The match was the first visit to Wembley for Wigan in 13 years.

Colours, kits and sponsorships
Until 1886, Wigan played in blue and white hooped jerseys before changing to the cherry and white hoops which are synonymous with the club. Since then, the home kits have consisted of cherry and white in different variations, usually hoops. Over the years, the home kits have consisted of a lighter shade of red rather than the cherry colour, however the club has still been known as "the Cherry and Whites".

The away or alternate kit colours have usually been blue and white. Some fans assume this is because Wigan originally played in these colours before the switch to the cherry and white. The away kits have been in different shades of blue, royal blue, navy blue and light blue with varied designs which have sometimes been hooped, one irregular hoop or just a block colour of blue. There have been exceptions, with a black and white alternative kit being used in 2001 and a black kit with red piping in 2007.

Wigan have had three main shirt sponsors.

From 1981, the first sponsor to appear on the shirt was JJB Sports.  In 1989 the club sponsor was Norweb until 1998. The following season Wigan was sponsored by Energi the electrical branch of Norweb. In 2000 Wigan changed its kit sponsor to JJB Sports owned by Dave Whelan who was also the owner of the club. JJB Sports remained the main sponsor after Dave Whelan sold the club in late 2007 and JJB Sports earlier in the same year. It was announced during the 2008 season that JJB would not renew the sponsorship contract for the 2009 season. It was announced on 24 January 2009 via the club's e-news facility that the new sponsor would be Meccabingo.com.

Kit manufacturers have included Umbro, Puma, Adidas and Nike. When JJB became the shirt sponsor the kit manufacturer was usually an associate of JJB Sports. Wigan's 2000 kit was made by Adidas who sponsored the East Stand at the JJB Stadium but when the association with JJB ended, the kits were made by Patrick, Dave Whelan's clothing company. In 2006 and 2007 the kit manufacturer became JJB Sports. The kit manufacturer changed to KooGa for the 2008 season. KooGa is 48% owned by JJB Sports. In 2008, Wigan signed a three-year deal with KooGa, the largest kit deal in the club's history and believed to be one of the biggest ever in rugby league history.

In November 2008 Wigan announced the production of a limited edition shirt, with £5 from each sale going to Wigan & Leigh Hospice.

In January 2009 the shirts for the 2009 season were unveiled. The home kit was a return to cherry red. The home kit consisted of the traditional club colours of cherry and white hoops. The replica shirts sold to fans had full hoops whilst the players shirts had a white panel on the back so that the name and number could be displayed and viewed easily. The away shirt was blue with one wide irregular white semi-hoop which was across the front of the shirt but did not stretch to the back.

Wigan continued with a variation of the cherry and white hoops for the 2010 home kit with the away kit returning to a mainly black kit with silver slashes.
The home kit for the 2011 season was revealed on 18 November 2010. 'The distinctive new design is a break from tradition and features shaded cherry-to-white irregular hoops. It also incorporates white flashes over the chest and hips which are designed to accentuate the shoulders and shrink the waist making the Warriors look even bigger and more fearsome than before. The KooGa shirt, which will display the logo of new sponsor Applicado-FS across the chest, will be worn with cherry red shorts and cherry red socks both with white flashes.'

The club opened a shop in the Grand Arcade, Wigan as an outlet for selling merchandise, on 9 December 2009 with an official opening taking place on 10 December 2009.

Stadiums

Wigan Football Club played its first match at Folly Field, Upper Dicconson Street on 30 November 1872 and remained at the ground for four years. Wigan Football Club became Wigan & District Football Club which played its matches at Prescott Street until the club disbanded. Reformed as Wigan Wasps Football Club, it returned to Folly Field from 1879 to 1886 when it moved its matches back to Prescott Street.

Wigan played its home games at Wigan Cricket Club on Prescott Street until 1901 when the club moved to Springfield Park which it shared with the town's association soccer club, Wigan United A.F.C. The first rugby match at Springfield Park was played on 14 September 1901 between Wigan and Morecambe in front of 4,000 spectators. The record rugby attendance for the ground was 10,000 achieved on 19 March 1902 when Wigan beat Widnes. Forty days later Wigan played its last game at Springfield Park when the team defeated the Rest of Lancashire Senior Competition.

In 1902 Wigan moved to a purpose built ground, Central Park. Wigan played its first game at Central Park against Batley on 6 September 1902 which Wigan won 14–8. Central Park was the club's home until 1999 when it moved to the new JJB Stadium. The last match at Central Park was against St Helens on 5 September 1999, a game which Wigan won 28–20 in front of 18,179 supporters.

Wigan now play home games at the 25,000 all-seater DW Stadium (formerly JJB Stadium) at Robin Park. Its first game at the JJB Stadium was a Super League play-off match against Castleford Tigers which Wigan lost 14–10. The DW Stadium is shared by Wigan Warriors Rugby League club and Wigan Athletic Football Club: the football club are soon to become owners but as a guarantee to Wigan Rugby League, the rugby club was given a 50-year lease on the stadium so that the club could still use the stadium, as part of a stadium share, when Whelan sold the club in 2007.

Honours

League
First Division / Super League:
Winners (22): 1908–09, 1921–22, 1925–26, 1933–34, 1945–46, 1946–47, 1949–50, 1951–52, 1959–60, 1986–87, 1989–90, 1990–91, 1991–92, 1992–93, 1993–94, 1994–95, 1995–96, 1998, 2010, 2013, 2016, 2018
Runners up (16): 1909–10, 1910–11, 1911–12, 1912–13, 1923–24, 1963–64, 1970–71, 1974–75, 1985–86, 1988–89, 1996, 2000, 2001, 2003, 2014, 2015
League Leader's Shield:
Winners (5): 1998, 2000, 2010, 2012, 2020
League Leader's Trophy:
Winners (1): 1970-71
Premiership 
Winners (6): 1986–87, 1991–92, 1993–94, 1994–95, 1996, 1997.
Runners-Up (1): 1992–93
War Emergency League
Winners (1): 1943–44.
Second Division / Championship:
Runners up (1): 1980-81
Lancashire League 
Winners (18): 1901–02, 1908–09, 1910–11, 1911–12, 1912–13, 1913–14, 1914–15, 1920–21, 1922–23, 1923–24, 1925–26, 1945–46, 1946–47, 1949–50, 1951–52, 1958–59, 1961–62, 1969–70.
Lancashire War League
Winners (1): 1940–41.

Domestic Cup(s)
Challenge Cup 
Winners (20): 1923–24, 1928–29, 1947–48, 1950–51, 1957–58, 1958–59, 1964–65, 1984–85, 1987–88, 1988–89, 1989–90, 1990–91, 1991–92, 1992–93, 1993–94, 1994–95, 2002, 2011, 2013, 2022.
Runners-Up (12): 1910–11, 1919–20, 1943–44, 1945–46, 1960–61, 1962–63, 1965–66, 1969–70, 1983–84, 1998, 2004, 2017.
Lancashire Cup 
Winners (21): 1905–06, 1908–09, 1909–10, 1912–13, 1922–23, 1928–29, 1938–39, 1946–47, 1947–48, 1948–49, 1949–50, 1950–51, 1951–52, 1966–67, 1971–72, 1973–74, 1985–86, 1986–87, 1987–88, 1988–89, 1992–93.
Runners-Up (14): 1913–14, 1914–15, 1925–26, 1927–28, 1930–31, 1934–35, 1935–36, 1936–37, 1945–46, 1953–54, 1957–58, 1977–78, 1980–81, 1984–85.
League Cup
Winners (8): 1982–83, 1985–86, 1986–87, 1988–89, 1989–90, 1992–93, 1994–95, 1995–96.
Runners-Up (1): 1993–94.
Charity Shield
Winners (4): 1985–86, 1987–88, 1991–92, 1995–96.
Runners-Up (4): 1988–89, 1989–90, 1990–91, 1992–93.
BBC2 Floodlit Trophy 
Winners (1): 1968–69.
Runners-Up (1): 1969–70.

International Cup(s)
World Club Challenge 
Winners (4): 1987, 1991, 1994, 2017.
Runners-Up (4): 1992, 2011, 2014, 2019.

Short Form Cups
World 7s 
Winners (1): 1991–92.
Middlesex 7s
Winners (1): 1996
Carnegie Floodlit 9s
Winners (1): 2010.

Pre-Northern Union
Wigan Charity Cup 
Winners (6): 1883, 1885, 1888, 1889, 1890, 1891
Runners-Up (1): 1886
 West Lancashire and Border Towns Cup
Winners (2): 1889, 1890
Runners-Up (1): 1887

Team
 BBC Sports Team of the Year: 1994.

Notes

References

Wigan Warriors
Wigan Warriors
Wigan Warriors